Dichomeris rufusella is a moth in the family Gelechiidae. It was described by Ponomarenko and Ueda in 2004. It is found in Thailand.

The forewings are greyish orange with scattered dark brown scales forming irregular transverse streaks and small dots. The pattern of the forewings consists of a dark brown area on the costal margin and twelve or thirteen dark brown costal marks. The hindwings are greyish brown, darker distally and with the basal part of the costal margin with white scales.

Etymology
The species name is derived from Latin ruf (meaning reddish).

References

Moths described in 2004
rufusella